Carlos Aramayo (born 16 May 1972) is a Bolivian alpine skier. He competed in the men's giant slalom at the 1992 Winter Olympics.

References

External links
 

1972 births
Living people
Bolivian male alpine skiers
Olympic alpine skiers of Bolivia
Alpine skiers at the 1992 Winter Olympics
Place of birth missing (living people)